Choi Jung-woo is a South Korean actor and model.

Biography and career
He was born on March 29, 1995 in Seoul. After sometime his parents moved to Jeju Island when he was five years old. When turned 11 his parents moved to Russia in Moscow, he attended school there and learned to speak Russian and English. There he went to British International School, he studied art. After sometime he decided to learn acting. He made his acting debut in 2017 in stage play Twenty. The same year he appeared in drama You Are Too Much. In 2018 he appeared in Love Alert. The next year he appeared in drama I Started Following Romance. The following year he appeared in several dramas Big Picture House, Kingmaker: The Change of Destiny, XX and Cheat on Me If You Can. He also appeared in movie Trace.

Filmography

Television series

Web series

Film

References

External links
 
 

1995 births
Living people
21st-century South Korean male actors
South Korean male models
South Korean male television actors
South Korean male film actors
South Korean male web series actors